In mathematics, an ellipse is a geometrical figure.

Ellipse may also refer to:

MacAdam ellipse, an area in a chromaticity diagram
Elliptic leaf shape
Superellipse, a geometric figure

As a name, it may also be:

The Ellipse, an area in Washington, D.C., United States
Ellipse Programmé, a French animation studio
Elipse, a Yugoslav rock band
Ellipse, a 2009 album by Imogen Heap
"Ellipse", a song from the album In Silence We Yearn by Oh Hiroshima
Explorer Ellipse, an American homebuilt aircraft design
La société Ellipse, a French aircraft manufacturer

Similar terms
Ellipsis, a punctuation mark
Ellipsis, a rhetorical suppression of words to give an expression more liveliness
Eclipse, an astronomical event
Elliptical (trainer), a stationary exercise machine

See also
 Ellipsis (disambiguation)
 Oval (disambiguation)